Trinchesia yamasui is a species of sea slug, an aeolid nudibranch, a shell-less marine gastropod mollusk in the family Trinchesiidae.

Distribution
This species was described from Okinawa, Japan. It has been reported from many places in the Indo-West Pacific region but some of these records are now known to be members of a species complex.

References

External links
 

Trinchesiidae
Gastropods described in 1993